The 1969 Balkans Cup was an edition of the Balkans Cup, a football competition for representative clubs from the Balkan states. It was contested by 6 teams and Beroe Stara Zagora won the trophy.

Group A

Group B

Finals

First leg

Second leg

Beroe Stara Zagora won 3–1 on aggregate.

Notes
Note 1: Dinamo Tirana walked off when, at 1–0 for Beroe Stara Zagora, a penalty was awarded to the Bulgarians.

References

External links 

 RSSSF Archive → Balkans Cup
 
 Mehmet Çelik. "Balkan Cup". Turkish Soccer

1969
1968–69 in European football
1969–70 in European football
1968–69 in Romanian football
1969–70 in Romanian football
1968–69 in Greek football
1969–70 in Greek football
1968–69 in Bulgarian football
1969–70 in Bulgarian football
1968–69 in Turkish football
1969–70 in Turkish football
1968–69 in Yugoslav football
1969–70 in Yugoslav football
1968–69 in Albanian football
1969–70 in Albanian football